Kisah Klasik Untuk Masa Depan (English: The Classic Story For The Future) is music album from Sheila on 7 released in 2000. It contains the hit singles "Sahabat Sejati", "Bila Kau Tak Disampingku", and "Sephia". Kisah Klasik Untuk Masa Depan had sold over 1,7 copies in Indonesia.

Sephia song by Sheila on 7 used for Soundtrack of Sinetrons with Same title, Sephia broadcast by SCTV year 2002. Starring Marcella Zalianty, Irgi Fahrezi, etc.

Track listing

Cover Versions 
In 2002, Taiwanese singer Chyi Chin covered the song Sephia in Mandarin under the title Sophia.

2000 albums
Sheila on 7 albums